Yakshimbetovo (Yaqşımbät) is a rural locality (a selo) and the administrative centre of Yakshimbetovsky Selsoviet, Kuyurgazinsky District, Bashkortostan, Russia. The population was 835 as of 2010. There are 9 streets.

Geography 
Yakshimbetovo is located 27 km southwest of Yermolayevo (the district's administrative centre) by road. Yangi-Yul is the nearest rural locality.

References 

Rural localities in Kuyurgazinsky District